TVSU may refer to:

 Union Island Airport (ICAO code), an airport in Saint Vincent and the Grenadines
 ThinkVantage System Update, one of the ThinkVantage Technologies software utilities